Good Hope Township may refer to the following townships in the United States:

 Good Hope Township, Itasca County, Minnesota
 Good Hope Township, Norman County, Minnesota
 Good Hope Township, Hocking County, Ohio